Zaifeng (12 February 1883 – 3 February 1951), also known as Tsai Feng, Prince of Ch'ün, formally known by his title Prince Chun, was a Manchu prince and regent of the late Qing dynasty. He was a son of Yixuan, the seventh son of the Daoguang Emperor, and the father of Puyi, the Last Emperor. He served as prince regent from 1908 to 1911 during the reign of his son until the Qing dynasty was overthrown by the Xinhai Revolution in 1911.

Family background
Zaifeng was born on 12 February of the 9th year of the Guangxu Emperor in the Aisin Gioro clan as the fifth son of Yixuan (Prince Chun). He was the second of Prince Chun's sons who managed to survive into adulthood. His mother was Liugiya Cuiyan, who was a maid in Prince Chun's residence before becoming one of the prince's concubines. Born to a Han bannerman family, her family name was "Liu" (劉) but was later changed to the Manchu-sounding "Liugiya" (劉佳) after she married Prince Chun and was transferred to a Manchu banner.

In 1875, after the childless Tongzhi Emperor's death, Zaifeng's elder half-brother, Zaitian was selected by the Empress Dowagers Cixi and Ci'an to be the new emperor. Zaitian was "adopted" by the empress dowagers as their son, which meant he was no longer nominally Prince Chun's son. He was then enthroned as the Guangxu Emperor. Prince Chun, as the biological father of the reigning emperor, received the highest accolades as well as high rank in the imperial court. In addition, he also had a close relationship with Empress Dowager Cixi, and his primary consort, Yehenara Wanzhen, was one of Cixi's sisters. In January 1891, after Prince Chun's death, an eight-year-old Zaifeng immediately inherited his father's princely title and became the second Prince Chun.

In 1900, during the Boxer Rebellion, when the armies of the Eight-Nation Alliance occupied Beijing, Prince Chun's fiancée reportedly committed suicide to prevent herself from being raped and humiliated by the foreign invaders.

Life in the government
Around late February or early March 1901, Prince Chun was appointed as an army inspector by the Qing imperial court, which had moved to Xi'an after evacuating Beijing. In June 1901, at the insistence of the foreign powers, the 18-year-old Prince Chun was appointed by as a Special Ambassador to offer regrets on behalf of the Qing government to Germany for the murder of German diplomat Baron von Ketteler. In July, Prince Chun left for Germany by sea and met Kaiser Wilhelm II in Potsdam in September. Although he first planned to subsequently tour around Europe and visit Belgium and London, he had to cancel his plans and return to China prematurely because of health issues of Empress Dowager Cixi.

Empress Dowager Cixi was pleased with how Prince Chun executed his diplomatic mission in Germany. He allegedly refused to kneel in front of the Kaiser even when the Germans insisted; the diplomatic slight was forgiven thanks to the negotiation skills of his adviser, Liang Cheng. In China, however, it was mandatory for foreign ambassadors to kneel in front of the Emperor. Due to his success, Prince Chun was subsequently given several key appointments over the following years. At the same time, Cixi grew wary of Prince Chun because the latter was a favorite of foreign powers. In fact, one reason why Prince Chun took up so many important positions in the imperial court after 1901 was that he was a protégé of the foreign powers, which Cixi was careful not to displease. However, she was as intent as ever on thwarting any challenge to her power, and so Prince Chun clearly posed a problem for her. Cixi saw an opportunity in 1902 on Prince Chun's return from Germany – she ordered him to marry Youlan, the daughter of Ronglu, a conservative politician in the imperial court and a staunch supporter of Cixi. Prince Chun loathed Ronglu because the latter played a leading role in ending the Hundred Days' Reform in 1898, and in the subsequent internment of the Guangxu Emperor. However, he still agreed to marry Ronglu's daughter because he felt it was unwise to oppose Cixi. The marriage between Prince Chun and Youlan was an unhappy one. With Prince Chun now firmly tied to her, Cixi no longer viewed him as a threat. When Prince Chun and Youlan's first son, Puyi, was born in 1906, Puyi became a likely heir to the throne. Prince Chun and Youlan had another son, Pujie, and three daughters – Yunying, Yunhe and Yunying.

Regency
The Guangxu Emperor died on 14 November 1908. On the same day, Empress Dowager Cixi issued an imperial edict proclaiming Prince Chun's eldest son, Puyi, as the successor. Puyi was "adopted" as the Guangxu Emperor's son; like the Guangxu Emperor before him, he was no longer nominally his biological father's son. Prince Chun was appointed Prince-Regent to assist the new emperor. Cixi died the following day, ending her 47-year-long control over China, while Prince Chun ruled as regent for the next three years. Prince Chun's first concern was to punish the Beiyang Army general Yuan Shikai, who had betrayed the Guangxu Emperor and supported Ronglu in putting an end to the Hundred Days' Reform in 1898. Prince Chun was prevented from executing his plan of having Yuan Shikai assassinated, but managed to have Yuan dismissed from office and sent home to Henan on an excuse of "curing his foot disease".

Over the next three years from 1909 to 1911, Prince Chun carried out the economic and political reforms that were initiated after the Boxer Rebellion ended in 1901, but he was torn between the conservative (mainly Manchu officials) and reformist (mostly Han Chinese officials) factions in the imperial court. The inexperienced Prince Chun concentrated more power in the hands of a small ruling court which angered bureaucrats on lower levels. He promised a constitution by 1916 with preparatory stages in between. Beginning on 5 February 1909, China held its first provincial assembly and local council elections (a council election was held in Tianjin as early as 1907). 21 provincial assemblies took their seats on 14 October. The vast majority elected were constitutional monarchists with a few crypto-revolutionaries and they turned the assemblies into hotbeds of dissent. Alarmed, the National Assembly, which convened in Beijing on 3 October 1910, had half of its 200 members appointed to balance the other half elected by the provincial assemblies. The provinces sent 98 members to the capital since Xinjiang, the 22nd province, had yet to hold elections to form an assembly due to its extreme underdevelopment. Prince Chun only appointed 96 members. Nevertheless, it was the elected members that dominated the floor and wooed the appointed ones to their side. The National Assembly urged Prince Chun to speed up the constitutional process and create a true parliament so the prince responded by pushing forth the expected deadline to 1913.

The Grand Council was replaced by an Imperial Cabinet led by Prince Qing on 8 May 1911. It dismayed constitutionalists as the Imperial Cabinet was not responsible to the National Assembly and contained seven Manchu imperial kinsmen with only four Han Chinese among its 13 members, breaking a long-standing policy of appointing equal numbers of both ethnicity. More power was concentrated in the hands of the Manchu minority than at any time since the dynasty's early years. The following day, the government announced that it would nationalize major railroads, a policy which infuriated many businessmen who invested heavily in railways. They were told that they would be compensated with only a portion of the amount they invested. This alienated many bourgeoisie and gentry, who started the Railway Protection Movement as a means of opposition while themselves becoming disposed towards revolution.

The period saw the revolutionaries attempting several insurrections to overthrow the Qing dynasty, and there was even one attempt by Wang Jingwei to assassinate Prince Chun in February 1910. Prince Chun did not have the maneuvering talent nor the lust for power of Empress Dowager Cixi, and he proved often indecisive and probably unfit for this troubled period.

In 1910, Prince Chun ousted from Tibet the 13th Dalai Lama, who would not return from India until 1913, whereupon the Dalai Lama declared Tibet independent.

On 10 October 1911, the Wuchang Uprising marked the start of the Xinhai Revolution, which aimed to topple the Qing dynasty and end imperial rule in China. The Qing imperial court was forced to recall back Yuan Shikai, despite Prince Chun's deep aversion for him, as Yuan was the only one capable of suppressing the revolution. Yuan became Prime Minister of the Imperial Cabinet on 16 November. Prince Chun, now deprived of any real power, stepped down on 6 December 1911, and was replaced by his sister-in-law, Empress Dowager Longyu, as regent. When he returned home that day, he told his family, "Now I am back in the family, and I can finally care for my children". The three years of regency were certainly the most painful years in Prince Chun's life; he never relished power the way Empress Dowager Cixi or Yuan Shikai did, and witnesses say he felt relieved when he left office.

Sir Reginald Johnston, tutor to Puyi, said that upon the Prince's appointment as regent it was already common knowledge that he was incapable of the enormous task ahead of him. He states Chun was:

Life after the Qing dynasty
Even after returning to private life, Prince Chun remained a respected figure, among both the Nationalist and later the Communist parties, who appreciated his peaceful stepping down from power and acceptance of China becoming a republic. Sun Yat-sen even visited him in Beijing in September 1912, during which he congratulated Prince Chun, and the latter formally declared his support for the Republic of China.

After the death of Empress Dowager Longyu in 1913, Prince Chun was put in charge of the small imperial court that remained around his son Puyi (no longer a ruling emperor), and he managed all the court's affairs until 1924 when Puyi was expelled from the Forbidden City. In 1917, when Puyi was briefly restored on the throne by the warlord Zhang Xun, Prince Chun played no significant role, as Zhang Xun's slogan for the restoration was "Do not allow the relatives of the emperor to participate in the government".

Prince Chun lived in the Northern Residence in Beijing until 1928. He spent most of his time in the library reading books on history and newly published magazines. Sometime after 1911, he married another wife, Lady Dengiya, with whom he had several children. His primary consort, Youlan, committed suicide in 1921 by swallowing opium after being publicly scolded by Dowager Consort Duankang (the highest-ranked woman in the imperial court after Empress Dowager Longyu's death in 1913) for the misconduct of her son, Puyi.

In 1928, Prince Chun moved to Tianjin, where he lived in the British and Japanese concessions. In August 1939, he relocated back to the Northern Residence in Beijing when Tianjin was flooded. During the Second Sino-Japanese War, Prince Chun was against the establishment of the Japanese puppet state of Manchukuo, and warned Puyi not to be involved. However, Puyi ignored his advice and was installed by the Japanese as the puppet figurehead ruler of Manchukuo. Prince Chun visited his son thrice in Manchukuo but ostensibly refused to participate in state affairs. Puyi wanted his father to live in Manchukuo but his father refused and returned to Beijing on an excuse that he was ill. At the end of the Second Sino-Japanese War, when the National Revolutionary Army recovered Beijing from the Japanese, a letter of sympathy was sent to Prince Chun by the Beijing Municipality in recognition of his attitude during the Japanese occupation.

After the end of the Chinese Civil War in 1949 and the Communist Party established the People's Republic of China, Prince Chun was held in high regard by the party's members. However, his son Puyi was arrested and imprisoned for ten years. Prince Chun sold the Northern Residence to the government out of financial difficulties. He also donated his library and art collection to Peking University, and provided relief aid to the victims of the Huai River flooding in 1950.

Prince Chun died on 3 February 1951 in Beijing. Many of his descendants reside in Beijing to this day, including Jin Youzhi, Jin Yuzhang and Jin Yulan. Many have changed their Manchu clan name Aisin Gioro to a Chinese family name Jin (金), which means "gold" ("Aisin" also means "gold" in Manchu).

Names and titles
 Names:
 Clan name / family name: Aisin Gioro
 Personal name: Zaifeng
 Courtesy name: Bohan or Yiyun
 Pseudonym: Jingyun. In his older days he chose a new pseudonym Shupi.
 Titles:
 Prince Chun of the First Rank, simplified to Prince Chun (or Prince Ch'un in Wade–Giles). Zaifeng held this title from 1891 until the fall of the Qing Dynasty in 1911.
 Prince-Regent
 Other references:
 Zai Jingyun

Family 

Primary Consort

 Youlan, Imperial Princess Consort Chun of the Gūwalgiya clan (1884 – 30 September 1921), sixth cousin five times removed
 Puyi, the Xuantong Emperor (7 February 1906 – 17 October 1967), first son
 Pujie (16 April 1907 – 28 February 1994), second son
 First daughter (1909–1925), personal name Yunying
 Married Runliang (1904–1925) of the Daur Gobulo clan
 Second daughter (1911–2001), personal name Yunhe
 Married Zheng Guangyuan, and had issue (one son, three daughters)
 Third daughter (1913–1992), personal name Yunying
 Married Runqi (1912–2007) of the Daur Gobulo clan in 1931, and had issue (two sons, one daughter)

Secondary Consort

 Secondary consort, of the Denggiya clan (1896–1942)
 Fourth daughter (1914–2003), personal name Yunxian
 Married Qifan of the Harqin Zhao clan, and had issue (one son, one daughter)
 Puqi (14 October 1916 – 25 September 1918), third son
 Fifth daughter (1917–1998), personal name Yunxin
 Married Wan Jiaxi, and had issue (three sons, one daughter)
 Puren (21 September 1918 – 10 April 2015), fourth son
 Sixth daughter (1919–1982), personal name Yunyu
 Married Ailan (1921–2005) of the Manchu Wang clan in 1943, and had issue (one son, four daughters)
 Seventh daughter (11 September 1921 – 9 August 2004), personal name Yunhuan
 Married Qiao Hongzhi (1919–1960) on 12 February 1950, and had issue (two sons, one daughter)

Ancestry

See also
 Royal and noble ranks of the Qing dynasty
 Ranks of imperial consorts in China#Qing

References

External links

1883 births
1951 deaths
19th-century Chinese people
20th-century Chinese politicians
20th-century viceregal rulers
Qing dynasty imperial princes
Qing dynasty regents
Grand Councillors of the Qing dynasty
Chinese people of the Boxer Rebellion
Manchu politicians
Qing dynasty politicians from Beijing
Prince Chun (醇)